John Hakizimana (born 26 October 1996) is a Rwandan long-distance runner. In 2018, he competed in the men's half marathon at the 2018 IAAF World Half Marathon Championships held in Valencia, Spain. He finished in 34th place.

In 2019, he represented Rwanda at the 2019 Military World Games held in Wuhan, China. He won the bronze medal in the men's marathon.

He represented Rwanda at the 2020 Summer Olympics in Tokyo, Japan. He competed in the men's marathon and he did not finish his race.

References

External links 
 

Living people
1996 births
Place of birth missing (living people)
Rwandan male long-distance runners
Rwandan male marathon runners
Athletes (track and field) at the 2020 Summer Olympics
Olympic athletes of Rwanda
Olympic male marathon runners